Benjamin Stone (born 3 April 1987) is a British actor. He has a twin sister. He is known for playing "Alek Petrov" in The Nine Lives of Chloe King, and William "Blank" Blankenship in the series 10 Things I Hate About You. He is also known for being a voice actor in four of the Harry Potter video games.

Filmography

References

External links 

 

1987 births
Living people
English male television actors
People from Kingston upon Thames
English male voice actors
English twins